Italian-Romanian relations are foreign relations between Italy and Romania. Both countries established diplomatic relations on 21 April 1873. Italy has an embassy in Bucharest and five honorary consulates (in Iaşi, Satu Mare, Braşov, Arad and Timișoara). Romania has an embassy in Rome, five general consulates (in Milan, Torino, Trieste, Bari and Bologna), two general honorary consulates (in Genova and Treviso) and two honorary consulates (in Napoli and Trento).

Both countries are full members of NATO and of the European Union. As of December 2017, there are around 1,168,552 people of Romanian descent living in Italy, being considered the largest foreign community in the country.

Historical and cultural relations 

Relations between Italy and Romania have traditionally been close due to a large kinship, thanks to their shared similar languages. During World War I, both countries fought the Austro-Hungarian Empire, and during World War II, contributed hundreds of thousands of troops to the Eastern Front where many died fighting the Soviets. More recently, after the collapse of the Soviet bloc, over a million Romanians moved to Italy for work and better living conditions.

Companies 
Several Italian banks are operating in Romania: Banca Italo Romena, Intesa Sanpaolo Bank and UniCredit Bank. The latter, had been in a partnership with Romanian former tennis player and business man Ion Ţiriac, between 2008 and 2015.

See also 
 Foreign relations of Italy
 Foreign relations of Romania
 Romanians in Italy
 Italians in Romania

References

External links 
  Italian embassy in Bucharest
  Romanian embassy in Rome (in Italian and Romanian only)
  Romanian general consulate in Milan

 
Romania
Bilateral relations of Romania